James Cantrill may refer to:

James E. Cantrill, captain in the Confederate States Army Cavalry
J. Campbell Cantrill,  U.S. Representative from Kentucky